41st NSFC Awards
January 6, 2007

Best Film: 
 Pan's Labyrinth 

The 41st National Society of Film Critics Awards, given on 6 January 2007, honored the best in film for 2006.

Winners

Best Picture 
1. Pan's Labyrinth (El laberinto del fauno)2. The Death of Mr. Lazarescu (Moartea domnului Lăzărescu)
3. Letters from Iwo Jima

 Best Director 
1. Paul Greengrass – United 93
2. Guillermo del Toro – Pan's Labyrinth (El laberinto del fauno)
2. Martin Scorsese – The Departed

Best Actor 
1. Forest Whitaker – The Last King of Scotland
2. Peter O'Toole – Venus
3. Ryan Gosling – Half Nelson

Best Actress 
1. Helen Mirren – The Queen
2. Laura Dern – Inland Empire
3. Judi Dench – Notes on a Scandal

Best Supporting Actor 
1. Mark Wahlberg – The Departed
2. Jackie Earle Haley – Little Children
3. Alan Arkin – Little Miss Sunshine

Best Supporting Actress 
1. Meryl Streep – The Devil Wears Prada and A Prairie Home Companion
2. Jennifer Hudson – Dreamgirls
3. Shareeka Epps – Half Nelson

Best Screenplay 
1. Peter Morgan – The Queen
2. William Monahan – The Departed
3. Eric Roth – The Good Shepherd

Best Cinematography 
1. Emmanuel Lubezki – Children of Men
2. Guillermo Navarro – Pan's Labyrinth (El laberinto del fauno)
3. Zhao Xiaoding – Curse of the Golden Flower (Mǎnchéngjìndàihuángjīnjiǎ)

Best Non-Fiction Film 
1. An Inconvenient Truth
2. Deliver Us from Evil
3. Dixie Chicks: Shut Up and Sing

Best Experimental Film 
 Inland Empire

Film Heritage Awards 
 Jean-Pierre Melville's Army of Shadows (1969), released by Rialto Pictures for the first time in the United States.
 Museum of the Moving Image for presenting the first complete U.S. retrospective of French filmmaker Jacques Rivette, including the premiere American showing of the director's legendary Out 1.

References

External links
 Past Awards

2006 film awards
2006